The 1979 NAIA Division II football season, as part of the 1979 college football season in the United States and the 24th season of college football sponsored by the NAIA, was the 10th season of play of the NAIA's lower division for football.

The season was played from August to November 1979 and culminated in the 1979 NAIA Division II Football National Championship, played at Donnell Stadium in Findlay, Ohio.

Findlay defeated Northwestern (IA) in the championship game, 51–6, to win their first NAIA national title.

Conference standings

Conference champions

Postseason

 ‡ Game played at Vermillion, South Dakota

See also
 1979 NAIA Division I football season
 1979 NCAA Division I-A football season
 1979 NCAA Division I-AA football season
 1979 NCAA Division II football season
 1979 NCAA Division III football season

References

 
NAIA Football National Championship